Krasimir Borisov Georgiev (born 8 April 1950) is a former Bulgarian football midfielder who played for Bulgaria in the 1974 FIFA World Cup. He also played for Levski Sofia, Lokomotiv Sofia and AC Omonia. Krasimir Borisov was assistant coach of Dimitar Penev during the 1994 FIFA World Cup, where Bulgaria won bronze medal for its fourth place.

Honours

Levski Sofia

 Bulgarian champion: 1976–77, 1978–79
 Bulgarian Cup: 1975–76, 1976–77, 1978–79

Lokomotiv Sofia

 1973 Balkans Cup winner

Omonia Nicosia

 Cypriot First Division: 1982, 1983, 1984
 Cypriot Cup: 1982, 1983

International

 1973–76 Balkan Cup winner with Bulgaria

References

External links

 Career Statistics at LevskiSofia.info

1950 births
Living people
Bulgarian footballers
Bulgaria international footballers
Bulgarian expatriate footballers
Association football midfielders
FC Lokomotiv 1929 Sofia players
Akademik Sofia players
PFC Levski Sofia players
AC Omonia players
First Professional Football League (Bulgaria) players
Cypriot First Division players
Expatriate footballers in Cyprus
Bulgarian expatriate sportspeople in Cyprus
1974 FIFA World Cup players